Noordenveld is a municipality in the northeastern part of the Netherlands.

Population centres

Water Board Noordenveld 
Noordenveld is also the name of a former Water Board, which had its office in Roden. Water Board Noordenveld arose from the Water Boards of Leutingewolde (1866-1967), De Zuidermaden (1914-1967), De Weehorst (1917-1967), De Peizer en Eeldermaden (1928-1984) and Matsloot-Roderwolde (1933-1984).

In 1995, Water Board Noordenveld was merged into Water Board Noorderzijlvest, based in Onderdendam.

Notable people 
 Hindericus Scheepstra (1859 in Roden – 1913) a Dutch writer, wrote children's book series Ot en Sien (1902). 
 Jan Britstra (1905 in Norg – 1987) a Dutch hurdler, competed in the 110 metres hurdles at the 1928 Summer Olympics
 J. P. Kuiper (1922 in Norg – 1985) a professor of social medicine, promoted the idea of unconditional basic income
 Harm Kuipers (born 1947 in Vries) academic, former speed skater and racing cyclist

References

External links 

 

 
Municipalities of Drenthe
Municipalities of the Netherlands established in 1998